Patriarch Parthenius of Constantinople may refer to:

 Parthenius I of Constantinople, Ecumenical Patriarch of Constantinople in 1639–1644
 Parthenius II of Constantinople, Ecumenical Patriarch of Constantinople in 1644–1646 and 1648–1651
 Parthenius III of Constantinople, Ecumenical Patriarch of Constantinople in 1656–1657